Lakshmi Baramma is a Kannada serial that airs on Colors Kannada (previously ETV Kannada) from Monday to Saturday at 7:30 pm. It premiered on 4 March 2013 and is the second longest running Kannada serial.

Plot
Laxmi is an innocent village girl. She was an orphan and was raised by her grandmother. She had an evil step mother and her two sons. However, she had a good bonding with Nanjundi, her youngest stepbrother.

After marrying Chandan realises that her husband was in love with his girlfriend Shruthi. She wishes not to be an obstacle in his path and runs away from him. But the situation lands her to the house of Shruthi. On the other hand, Shruthi unknowing the truth about Laxmi accepts her as her younger sister and names her Chinnu much against the wishes of her mother.

The twist in the tale arrives when Shruthi is Chandan's cousin and their marriage fixed. Knowing this truth she consoles herself and decides to look into the marriage arrangements. At this time her marriage truth is discovered by Parvathy, her mother-in-law. Ranjith his uncle also aware of this truth. Kumudha, Chandan's evil aunt along with her secret husband Manoj tries to acquire the whole property in her name. The family is unaware of her evil plans. Kailash, Shruthi's father discovers Kumudha's truth but he was beaten to death by her husband. He was timely saved by Laxmi. Kumudha who is furious at Laxmi is furious and learns of her marriage secret. Now she plays a mind game with her. Kailash slowly recovers and then he warns Kumudha. Later even he gets to know the truth of Laxmi. Parvathi and Kailash decide to tell this truth to Shruthi and finally, everybody knows the truth.

Shruthi's mother Kalpana develops hatred against her. Using this Kumudha plays mind games with the family. Finally, Kumudha is exposed by Kailash, Ranjith and Laxmi. In the meantime Shruthi was pregnant. Her child is believed to be dead. Later they get another baby through invitro-fertilization process and Laxmi becomes the surrogate mother. Later the earlier baby which was presumed to be dead was alive and it was captured and raised by Kumudha. After much hardship, the elder baby is back with the family and it was named Siri. The second child with Laxmi as a surrogate mother was named Adhya.

At this time a new character enters the lives of this joint family named Aniruddh. He gains the trust of the family and later he kidnaps Shruthi and makes her forget her past and convinces her that she is Shravya. On the other hand, the family believes Shruthi has died. Laxmi discovers Shruthi is alive and she is now identified as Shravya. She is not believed and she leaves the house to return with her sister.

Chandu's family disguises themselves as the Chakravarthi family, a wealthy business family from London and enter Bhargavi Devi's house. Ramachandra Rayaru disguises as Vasanth Chakravarthy, the eldest member of the family, his wife Sulochana as Shalini Chakravarthi, their daughter Kalpana as Sumalatha Chakravarthi and her husband Kailash as Amarnath Chakravarthi (S/O Shalini and Vasanth Chakravarthi). Ramu disguises as Sudeep Chakravarthi (S/O Sumalatha and Amarnath) and Chandu as car driver, Yuvraj Singh, Shveta as Sushma - daughter of Shalini and Vasanth. Ranjith disguises as Shvetananda Swamiji. The rest of the plot revolves around how Laxmi, Chandan along with the family bringing Shruthi back into their lives and remind her of the past.

Cast
 Chandan Kumar / Akarsh Byramudi / Shine Shetty / Chandan Gowda as Chandan / Chandu / Yuvraj Singh
 Kavitha Gowda/Rashmi Prabhakar as Lakshmi / Lacchi / Chinnu
 Neha Gowda as Shruthi / Gombe / Shravya
 Vijay Suriya as Siddharth / Siddu
 Deepa Ravishankar as Parvathi, Chandu's mother
 Anikha sindya as Kumudha, Shruti's aunt
 Jeevan Neenasam as Ranjith / Shvetananda Swamiji
 Vijay as Ramu / Sudeep Chakravarthi
 Navya gowda as Shwetha / Sushma
 Lakshmi Siddaiyya as Kalpana / Sumalatha Chakravarthi
 Jayabalu as Sulochana / Shalini Chakravarthi
 Dattanna as Ramachandra Rayaru / Vasanth Chakravarthi
 Rohit Nagesh as Manoj
 Hmt Vijay as Boregowda
 Vikram Vasudeva Rao as Nanjundi
 Vasanth Kumar as Kailash / Amarnath Chakravarthi
 Niranjan Kumar as Basava
 Chi Bharath as Giri
 Kamalashri as Thathamma
 Lakshmi Sanjay as Revathi
 Ramaswamy as Yeshwanth
 Baby Monisha as Siri
 Anil Kumar Tiptur
 Rohith Rangaswamy as Anirudh / Arun - Bhargavi Devi's brother
 Roopesh Kumar as Guru - Bhargavi Devi's brother
 Nandini guru as Bhargavi Devi 
 Soumya Bhat as Medha - Bhargavi Devi's daughter
 Sagar Gowda as Vasu - Bhargavi Devi's servant

Crossover
The serials Kulavadhu and Lakshmi Baramma were interconnected for months together in the quest to find the missing daughter of the character Gombe. The girl who was missing was being taken care of by the family in Kulavadhu serial. And, finally, the important characters from both serials come together for a while till the missing girl's episode gets over.

Years after end of the daily soap, it made a Mahansangama episode with Nammane Yuvarani for Dasara. Both families met at Lakshmi Baramma set.

Adaptations

References

2013 Indian television series debuts
2020 Indian television series endings
Kannada-language television shows
Colors Kannada original programming